Ahmednagar Junction serves Ahmednagar in Ahmednagar district in the Indian state of Maharashtra

History
The  broad gauge Manmad–Daund line was opened in 1878 and connects the two main sections (south-east and north-east) of Great Indian Peninsula Railway. The line is being doubled by Central Railway along with 4 other busy routes nearby.

Ahmednagar station will now be a part of the Pune railway division. Twenty four (24) stations of the Daund-Ankai section will be merged with Pune railway division. The Daund-Ankai section is currently under the management of the Solapur railway division. The change to the Pune division will increase the chances of starting demu services between Ahmednagar and Pune stations.

One of the oldest and important railway project of Ahmednagar railway station was Kalyan-Ahmednagar railway project which was in planning stage since British regime. It was referred as 3rd ghat project. The survey of this project was carried out in 1973,2000, 2006, 2014 etc. This project was in pink book in 2010. This project could not be completed. The alignment length of this project was 184 km and it could have been shortest route for marathwada, andhra and telangana. The major challenge for this project was 18.96 km long tunnel in Malshej ghat section 

Malshej Kriti samiti is following for Kalyan - Ahmednagar railway project. Kalyan-Murbad section which is first phase of this project is already under survey stage.

Survey of Ahmednagar-Aurangabad Railway line with 115 kms length was also carried out in March 2021. The DPR Report of this project is under preparation.

Ahmednagar-Karmala railway option is also getting explored.  Ahmednagar railway station will become an important railway junction in future to the level similar to daund railway junction. Kalyan-Murbad-Ahmednagar line is also possible in future.

With a deadline of 2019, the Indian Railways has initiated work on the railway line between Parli and Beed, which is part of the long-pending Parli–Beed–Ahmednagar project. Work on the multicrore project has begun from either ends of the proposed 261 km track. The  route has a financial outlay of Rs 2,272 crore. The centre and state government have agreed to bear 50% of the cost each. The work is still going on at a very slow pace.

The direct route between following places had not been started as of November 2017.
 Ahmednagar–Pune
 Ahmednagar–Nashik
 Ahmednagar–Aurangabad
 Ahmednagar–Kalyan

Amenities
Amenities at Ahmednagar railway station include: computerized reservation office, subscriber trunk dialling/public call office booth, waiting room, retiring room, vegetarian refreshments, and book stall.

Through trains from Ahmednagar

Express/Mail trains

NOTE: Days of arrival/departure are on Ahmednagar.
 Hubli– Express is attached to Goa Express at Londa.
11039 Kolhapur–Gorakhpur Slip Express.
No slip coach attached/detached at Bhusawal. Passengers who board between Kolhapur & Bhusawal and traveling beyond Bhusawal up to Gorakhpur in S1 coach need to get down at Bhusawal and have to board 15017 at Bhusawal Jn and sit in same berth number of S1 coach. S1 coach of 15017 is reserved for 11039 slip train passengers who board from Bhusawal Jn.

Garib Rath / Express / Mails Trains (Weekly, Biweekly, Triweekly)

NOTE: Days of arrival/departure are on Ahmednagar.

Passenger trains

NOTE: Days of arrival/departure are on Ahmednagar.
 Mumbai CST–Sainagar Shirdi Fast Passenger is attached to Mumbai–Bijapur/Pandharpur passenger up to Daund.

References

External links
 Trains at Ahmednagar
 

Railway stations in Ahmednagar district
Solapur railway division
Railway stations in India opened in 1878
Ahmednagar